A neutron star merger is a type of stellar collision.

When two neutron stars orbit each other closely, they gradually spiral inward due to gravitational radiation. When the two neutron stars meet, their merger leads to the formation of either a more massive neutron star, or a black hole (depending on whether the mass of the remnant exceeds the Tolman–Oppenheimer–Volkoff limit). The merger can also create a magnetic field that is trillions of times stronger than that of Earth in a matter of one or two milliseconds. These events are believed to create short gamma-ray bursts. 

The merger of binary neutron stars is believed to be the origin of most elements with large atomic weights - the r-process elements. 

The mergers are also believed to produce kilonovae, which are transient sources of fairly isotropic longer wave electromagnetic radiation due to the radioactive decay of heavy r-process nuclei that are produced and ejected during the merger process.

Observed mergers

On 17 August 2017, the LIGO/Virgo collaboration detected a pulse of gravitational waves, named GW170817, associated with the merger of two neutron stars in NGC 4993, an elliptical galaxy in the constellation Hydra. GW170817 also seemed related to a short (≈2 second long) gamma-ray burst, GRB 170817A, first detected 1.7 seconds after the GW merger signal, and a visible light observational event first observed 11 hours afterwards, SSS17a.

The association of GW170817 with GRB 170817A in both space and time is strong evidence that neutron star mergers do create short gamma-ray bursts.  The subsequent detection of event Swope Supernova Survey 2017a (SSS17a) in the area in which GW170817 and GRB 170817A were known to have occurred and its having the expected characteristics for a kilonova is strong evidence that neutron star mergers do produce kilonovae.

In October 2018, astronomers reported that GRB 150101B, a gamma-ray burst event detected in 2015, may be directly related to the historic GW170817, a gravitational wave event detected in 2017, and associated with the merger of two neutron stars. The similarities between the two events, in terms of gamma ray, optical and x-ray emissions, as well as to the nature of the associated host galaxies, are "striking", suggesting the two separate events may both be the result of the merger of neutron stars, and both may be a kilonova, which may be more common in the universe than previously understood, according to the researchers.

Also in October 2018, scientists presented a new way to use information from gravitational wave events (especially those involving the merger of neutron stars, like GW170817) to determining the Hubble constant, which is essential in establishing the rate of expansion of the universe. The two earlier methods for finding the Hubble constant, one based on redshifts and another based on the cosmic distance ladder, yield different values, which might be reconciled by another standard candle.

In April 2019 the LIGO and Virgo gravitational wave  observatories announced the detection of candidate event that is, with a probability 99.94%, the merger of two neutron stars. Despite extensive follow-up observations, no electromagnetic counterpart could be identified.  

In February 2018 the Zwicky Transient Facility began to track neutron star events via gravitational wave observation, as evidenced by "systematic samples of tidal disruption events".

XT2 (magnetar)

In 2019, analysis of data from the Chandra X-ray Observatory revealed another binary neutron star merger at a distance of 6.6 billion light years, an x-ray signal called XT2. The merger produced a magnetar; its emissions could be detected for several hours.

See also

Tolman–Oppenheimer–Volkoff limit

Notes

References

External links
 Related videos:
 
 
 
 

2017 in science
2017 in space
Impact events
Merger
Stellar astronomy